Renate Ewert (9 November 1933 in Königsberg, East Prussia, Germany - now Kaliningrad, Russia – 4 December 1966, Munich, West Germany) was a German actress.

Filmography

References

External links
 
 

1933 births
1966 deaths
German film actresses
Actors from Königsberg
20th-century German actresses
Burials at the Ohlsdorf Cemetery